The Late Show is a live album by saxophonists Eddie "Lockjaw" Davis and Johnny Griffin recorded at Minton's Playhouse in 1961 and released on the Prestige label in 1965. The album was the fourth release from the recordings at Minton's after The Tenor Scene, The First Set and The Midnight Show.

Reception
The Allmusic site awarded the album 3 stars.

Track listing 
 "Dee Dee's Dance" (Denzil Best) - 6:12
 "Billie's Bounce" (Charlie Parker) - 8:43    
 "Epistrophy" (Thelonious Monk, Kenny Clarke) - 8:46    
 "Light and Lovely" (Eddie "Lockjaw" Davis, George Duvivier) - 11:33

Personnel 
Eddie "Lockjaw" Davis, Johnny Griffin - tenor saxophone
 Junior Mance - piano
 Larry Gales - bass
 Ben Riley - drums

References 

Eddie "Lockjaw" Davis live albums
Johnny Griffin live albums
1965 albums
Albums produced by Esmond Edwards
Prestige Records live albums